Wiśniewo may refer to the following places:
Wiśniewo, Łódź Voivodeship (central Poland)
Wiśniewo, Ciechanów County in Masovian Voivodeship (east-central Poland)
Wiśniewo, Podlaskie Voivodeship (north-east Poland)
Wiśniewo, Mława County in Masovian Voivodeship (east-central Poland)
Wiśniewo, Ostrołęka County in Masovian Voivodeship (east-central Poland)
Wiśniewo, Ostrów Mazowiecka County in Masovian Voivodeship (east-central Poland)
Wiśniewo, Greater Poland Voivodeship (west-central Poland)
Wiśniewo, Elbląg County in Warmian-Masurian Voivodeship (north Poland)
Wiśniewo, Iława County in Warmian-Masurian Voivodeship (north Poland)
Wiśniewo, West Pomeranian Voivodeship (north-west Poland)